Janq'u Q'awa (Aymara janq'u white, q'awa little river, ditch, crevice, fissure, gap in the earth, "white brook" or "white ravine", Hispanicized spelling  Ancoccahua) is a mountain in the Andes of Peru, about  high. It is situated in the Puno Region, Melgar Province, Orurillo District. Janq'u Q'awa lies southeast of the La Raya mountain range at the lake Janq'uquta, northwest of it.

References

Mountains of Peru
Mountains of Puno Region